USS Sylph was a schooner launched in 1831 at Baltimore as the mercantile Sarah Ann. The Navy purchased her in April 1831 and renamed her Sylph on 26 April 1831. She underwent fitting out at the Washington Navy Yard and was commissioned there on 19 May 1831 under the command of Lieutenant H. E. V. Robinson.

Sylph was reported ready for sea on 3 June. On that day or shortly thereafter she sailed for Norfolk in company with the schooners  and Fourth of July. The three schooners were under orders to patrol the coasts of the southern states to protect Southern live oak growing on public lands. (Live oak was then used extensively in shipbuilding.) 

Sylph left Norfolk on 29 July sailed to Pensacola. Her station was District 7, i.e., the Gulf Coast from the Perdido River (just west of Pensacola), to the mouth of the Sabine River.

In August 1831 Sylph sailed on her first patrol and was never heard from again. A vessel reported that during a strong storm near the mouth of the Mississippi she had sighted a ship in distress that was believed to have been Sylph.

Citations and references
Citations

References
 

1831 ships
Schooners of the United States Navy
Maritime incidents in 1831
Missing ships
Ships lost with all hands